Watson Peak may refer to the following mountains:

Canada
 Watson Peak (British Columbia)

United States
 Watson Peak (Alaska)
 Watson Peak (Arizona) in Yavapai County
 Watson Peak (Custer County, Idaho)
 Watson Peak (Lemhi County, Idaho)

See also
 Watson Peaks, Antarctica

References